Otis Ray Norton (born September 22, 1937 in Tulsa, Oklahoma) is a former American sprinter who competed in the 1960 Olympics in Rome.

Track career 

After graduating high school in 1955, Norton initially went to Oakland City College staying for just one year. He left in 1956 for San Jose State College, where he was coached by Lloyd (Bud) Winter. He first achieved national fame by equalling the world record of 9.3 for 100 y as a college junior, in San Jose on April 12, 1958. The next year, 1959, was an outstanding one. He won three gold medals at the 1959 Pan American Games and he tied Leamon King's record at the 100 m at 10.1 s in San Jose on April 18. His achievements in 1959 were recognised by being voted Track and Field News's United States Men's Athlete of the Year – the inaugural award of this honour.

In 1960, Norton carried on his impressive form of the previous year by tying four world records: he equalled the 220 y record of 20.6 s in Berkeley on March 19; equalled again the 100 y record of 9.3 s in San Jose on April 2; equalled the 200 m record of 20.6 s in Philadelphia on April 30; and equalled the newly set record for the 200 m of 20.5 s in Stanford on July 2.  He qualified for the 100 and 200 at the 1960 Olympics by coming first in both events at the United States Olympic Trials, equalling the world record in the process in the 200 m. However, his form at the Olympics itself deserted him, most probably because of nerves, and he finished a disappointing last in both the 100 and 200 m finals. Norton's failure on Thursday September 1 in the 100 m was one of such disasters that befell American favorites that day and the day was to become known as 'Black Thursday'. He tried to make amends for his failures in the individual events in the 4 × 100 m relay. The team of Frank Budd, Norton, Stone Johnson and Dave Sime finished first in a world record time of 39.4 s but were disqualified because at the first exchange from Budd to Norton, Norton started too early and the exchange happened outside the changeover box. The West German team who finished second in 39.5 s received the gold medals and became the new world record holders. Norton came to the attention of the world's press at the Olympics for more than his athletic tribulations when he was seen courting his fellow American sprint star and public favorite Wilma Rudolph.

Early in 1960, College and the social work degree he was working on. Norton continued to train at the San Clara Valley Youth Village. Norton retired from athletics that season and was drafted as an American football player at the end of that year.

NFL career 

Norton played halfback for the San Francisco 49ers of the National Football League during the 1960 and 1961 seasons.

Later life 

In 1966, Norton sought the nomination to sit as a Republican for the California Assembly 17th District (Oakland and Berkeley). At the time he was working as a partner in a service agency for attorneys.

Ray currently resides in Napa, California.

Rankings

Norton was ranked among the best in the US and the world in both the 100 and 200 m sprint events between 1958 and 1960, according to the votes of the experts of Track and Field News.

USA Championships 

Norton was a formidable performer at the USA national championships.

References 

1937 births
Living people
Sportspeople from Tulsa, Oklahoma
Track and field athletes from San Jose, California
American male sprinters
San Jose State Spartans men's track and field athletes
World record setters in athletics (track and field)
Athletes (track and field) at the 1959 Pan American Games
Athletes (track and field) at the 1960 Summer Olympics
Olympic track and field athletes of the United States
Pan American Games gold medalists for the United States
Pan American Games medalists in athletics (track and field)
Players of American football from Oklahoma
American football halfbacks
San Francisco 49ers players
Track and field athletes from Oklahoma
Track and field athletes in the National Football League
USA Outdoor Track and Field Championships winners
Medalists at the 1959 Pan American Games